The Battle of Tuyutí (Tuiuti in Portuguese) was a Paraguayan offensive in the Paraguayan War targeting the Triple Alliance encampment of Tuyutí. It is considered to be the bloodiest battle ever in South America. The result of the battle was an Allied victory, which added to the Paraguayan troubles after the loss of its fleet in the Battle of Riachuelo.

This battle is particularly important in Brazil, being nicknamed "A Batalha dos Patronos" (The Battle of the Patrons) since the Army's patrons of the Infantry, Cavalry and Artillery fought on it. The Battle of Tuyutí also marks the Brazilian Army's Infantry Day due to the loss of brigadier general Antônio de Sampaio (known as Brigadeiro Sampaio), patron of the Infantry, while holding his position at the head of his Divisão Encouraçada (Ironclad Division, the 3rd Division).

Another attack on the Allied camp was made in November 1867.

Strategic situation

In this phase of the war the Allies' strategic objective was to take the Fortress of Humaitá, the gateway to Paraguay. They intended to launch an amphibious operation, which required their land forces to take the fortress from the rear. After crossing the Paraná River from Argentina and landing in Paraguay, they had a long march across country studded with lagoons and carrizal (reed beds growing in marsh). The fortress was defended by the extensive earthworks of its Polígono or Quadrilateral design. It was in this context that the Battle of Tuyutí occurred.

Preliminaries

In early May 1866, the Paraguayan attack at the Estero Bellaco marsh failed. The allies camped for over two weeks before resuming their advance on 20 May 1866. Paraguayan leader Francisco Solano López moved his headquarters to Paso Pucu, where he dug trenches in the passes from Gomez to Rojas. After learning that the allies were planning to attack on the 25th, López ordered a surprise attack on Tuyutí, "a swampy, scrub-brush savannah", for the 24th. The 24 May 1866 battle of Tuyutí is known as the First Battle of Tuyutí; the second Battle of Tuyutí occurred on 7 November 1867.

Battle

The Paraguayans attacked in three columns at 11:55 after a Congreve rocket signaled the attack. General Vicente Barrios, with 8,000 infantry and 1,000 cavalry, attacked the Allied left, which were Brazilians under the command of general Osório. General Isidoro Resquín, with 7,000 cavalry and 3,000 infantry attacked the Allied right flank. Colonel José Eduvigis Díaz, with 6,000 infantry and 1,000 cavalry, attacked the Allied center, general Flores' Vanguard Division. Colonel Hilario Marcó, with 7,000 men and 48 cannons, formed the reserve at Estero Rojas

The attack began in the center, where the Uruguayans were forced back along with some Brazilian Volunteer battalions. On the left of the Allied encampment, lieutenant-colonel  had ordered the construction of a large moat in front of his artillery pieces, which were thirty La Hitte cannons, according to one source. When the Paraguayan onslaught reached it, they were in grapeshot range and unable to cross the obstacle. The Paraguayans tried to circle the artillery, avoiding the incoming fire, but encountered Antônio Sampaio's 3rd Infantry Division. Sampaio, shouted, "Fogo, Batalhão!" (Open fire, Battalion!). This unit fought desperately in the muddy terrain though their commander died in the process. At this point, Osório ordered his reserves to attack and they managed to repel the Paraguayan center.

Mallet's hidden ditch, the Fosso de Mallet, was the inspiration for Mallet's famous battle cry, "Eles que venham. Por aqui não passarão" ("Let them come. They won't pass through here"). Mallet's cannons were dubbed "artilharia revólver" (revolver artillery), such was the precision and speed of their firing.

On the allied left, the Paraguayans forced back the few Brazilian units, almost reaching the Allied camp. Osório reinforced the Brazilian lines with various units, finally committing the 2nd Cavalry Division, commanded by general João Manuel Mena Barreto. The Paraguayans continued to attack until they were encircled and annihilated. In the Argentine sector, the Paraguayan cavalry under general Resquín routed the Argentine cavalry under generals Cáceres and Hornos.

Soon the battle turned into "a series of charges and countercharges, a Latin American version of Waterloo". The Paraguayan columns continued to attack, but could not overcome the allied firepower. In the words of colonel George Thompson of the Paraguayan army (a veteran of the battle), "at 4 p.m. the firing was over, the Paraguayans being completely defeated, and their army destroyed. The Allies had suffered severely also, but they still had an army left. The Paraguayans left 6,000 dead on the field; the Allies only took some 350 prisoners, all wounded. This was because the Paraguayans would never surrender but, when wounded, fought on till they were killed. 7,000 wounded were taken into the Paraguayan hospitals from this battle, those with slight wounds not going into hospital at all... The Allies lost above 8,000 killed and wounded."

Aftermath
As result of the battle, each side's losses were as follows:

There have been contradictory reports about the casualty numbers and debates over the true values. Centurión, reported that Paraguayan dead numbered about 5,000, maybe more, and the wounded 7,000, while the allies lost 8,000 killed and wounded. Thompson agreed with the number of Paraguayan wounded, but claimed that 6,000 were killed. Other authors give different numbers: in Barreto's opinion 6,500 Paraguayans were killed, while allied casualties were 3,647, with 3,011 Brazilians. According to Silva Pimentel 7,000 Paraguayans were killed. Rawson and Beverina also declared that 7,000 Paraguayans were killed along with "so many others wounded", while the allied casualties were 4,000. Osório's Order of the Day affirmed that the Paraguayan dead numbered "more" than 3,000, with 200 wounded and 21 prisoners; according to this document, Brazilian casualties were 412 killed and 2,003 wounded.

Tuyutí was the last major Paraguayan attack. Ultimately, it was a devastating Paraguayan defeat. "The 10,000 men who had not been killed or [seriously] wounded were completely scattered and disorganised, and it was some days before they were again collected", wrote Thompson. "The Allies buried some of their own dead, but they heaped up the Paraguayan corpses in alternate layers with wood, in piles of 50 to 100, and burnt them. They complained that the Paraguayans were so lean they that they would not burn".

The largest battle ever fought in South America was over. Lopéz's flanking maneuver had failed, but it had come very close to succeeding. In fact, the Allies were unable to pursue the enemy, since they had few horses remaining. They needed to regain strength and rebuild.

The Allied forces stayed in their camp until September, but disease struck the camp, claiming some 10,000 victims. Even after September, advances were little and the allied lines settled down to await further orders. These months of static warfare were filled with small-scale skirmishes and sporadic fire, being known in the Allied forces as the "Tuyutí Black Lines".

The Brazilian Army's Patrons of the Infantry (Antônio de Sampaio), Cavalry (Manuel Luís Osório) and Artillery (Émile Mallet) fought in Tuyutí.

Death of general Sampaio

At the head of the 3rd Division of the Imperial Army, dubbed the Ironclad Division, composed of the Arranca-Toco, Vanguardeiro and Treme-Terra battalions, brigadier general Antônio de Sampaio fought in the crossing operations of the Paraná River, in the Battle of Confluência and in the Battle of Estero Bellaco. At the Battle of Tuyutí (May 24, 1866, ironically the date of his birthday), Sampaio was seriously injured three times by artillery shrapnel, gangrenizing his right thigh, and twice on his back. Evacuated from the battlefield, he died on board the steam ship Eponina, which was taking him to Buenos Aires. Buried in that capital on 8 July 1866, his remains were repatriated in 1869 to Rio de Janeiro, being deposited in the Church of Bom Jesus da Coluna, in the Asilo dos Voluntários da Pátria (Asylum of the Invalides of the Motherland), where they remained until 14 November 1871, when they were transferred again to his homeland in the province of Ceará.

Until 25 October 1873, his remains were deposited in the current Cathedral of Fortaleza, being buried afterwards in the Cemetery of São João Batista, in Fortaleza.

On 24 May 1966, on the occasion of the centenary of his death and the Battle of Tuyutí, his remains were removed to a mausoleum on Bezerra de Menezes avenue, in Fortaleza, where they remained until 24 May 1996, when his remains came to rest permanently in the Pantheon Brigadeiro Sampaio, erected in the frontal part of the Fortress of Nossa Senhora da Assunção, headquarters of the 10th Military Region of the Brazilian Army.

Brigadier General Sampaio is the patron of the Brazilian Army Infantry, with Infantry Day being celebrated on May 24. For many years the date was celebrated as the Brazilian Army Day.

References

Citations

Bibliography
 AZEVEDO PIMENTEL, Joaquim S. de. Episódios militares. Rio de Janeiro: Biblioteca do Exército, 1978.
 BARRETO, honorary lieutenant José Francisco Paes. História da Guerra do Paraguay. Recife: Typographia de F. P. de Boulitreau, 1893.
CERQUEIRA, Dionísio. Reminiscências da Campanha do Paraguai. Rio de Janeiro: Biblioteca do Exército, 1979.
 BEVERINA, colonel Juan. La Guerra del Paraguay (1865-70): resumen histórico. 2nd edition. Buenos Aires: Institución Mitre, 1973
 CENTURIÓN, colonel Juan Crisostomo. Memorias: reminiscencias históricas sobre la Guerra del Paraguay, Asunción: El Lector, 1987, 4 vols
 .
 .
 .
 .
 .
 RAWSON, Lieutenant colonel Manuel. Bibliografía del teniente general Emilio Mitre. [Buenos Aires]
 .
 THOMPSON, George. La Guerra del Paraguay, Asunción: RP Ediciones, 1992 [1st Edition 1869]
 .
 .

External links

Tuyuti
Tuyuti
Tuyuti
Tuyuti
May 1866 events
History of Ñeembucú Department